Jean-Armand de Bessuéjouls Roquelaure (Lassouts, Aveyron 24 February 1721 – 23 April 1818), was Archbishop of Mechelen, Belgium. He was appointed Bishop of Senlis (France) on 17 March 1754 and resigned on 21 September 1801. He was appointed Archbishop on 9 April 1802.

See also
 Archbishopric of Mechelen-Brussels

References
 Jean-Armand de Bessuéjouls Roquelaure

1721 births
1818 deaths
People from Aveyron
18th-century French Roman Catholic bishops
19th-century Roman Catholic archbishops in France
Roman Catholic archbishops of Mechelen-Brussels
Bishops of Senlis
Members of the Académie Française